Vărăncău may refer to several places in Moldova:

Vărăncău, Soroca, a commune in Soroca district
Vărăncău, Transnistria, a commune in Transnistria